Sydney Bailey (16 April 1884 – 19 July 1967) was a British cyclist. He competed in the 100km event at the 1908 Summer Olympics.

References

External links
 

1884 births
1967 deaths
British male cyclists
Olympic cyclists of Great Britain
Cyclists at the 1908 Summer Olympics
Place of birth missing